DEC Technical (TCS) is a 7-bit character set developed by Digital Equipment Corporation.

Character set 

� Characters from 31 to 37 are intended to assemble a 3x5 uppercase sigma and do not have Unicode equivalents.

See also
DEC Multinational Character Set (MCS)
DEC National Replacement Character Set (NRCS)
DEC Special Graphics
Symbol (typeface) § Encoding

References

Further reading
 

 

Character sets
Digital Equipment Corporation